Mississippi County is the easternmost county in the U.S. state of Arkansas. As of the 2020 census, the population was 40,685. There are two county seats, Blytheville and Osceola. The county was formed on November 1, 1833, and named for the Mississippi River which borders the county to the east. Mississippi County is part of the First Congressional District in Arkansas.

The Blytheville, AR Micropolitan Statistical Area includes all of Mississippi County.

Geography

Major highways

 Interstate 55
 U.S. Highway 61
 Highway 14
 Highway 18
 Highway 18 Business
 Highway 77
 Highway 118
 Highway 119
 Highway 135
 Highway 136
 Highway 137
 Highway 137 Spur
 Highway 140
 Highway 150
 Highway 151
 Highway 158
 Highway 181
 Highway 239
 Highway 239 Spur 
 Highway 947

Adjacent counties

Dunklin County, Missouri (northwest)
Pemiscot County, Missouri (north)
Dyer County, Tennessee (northeast)
Lauderdale County, Tennessee (east)
Tipton County, Tennessee (southeast)
Crittenden County (south)
Poinsett County (southwest)
Craighead County (west)

National protected area
 Big Lake National Wildlife Refuge

Demographics

2020 census

As of the 2020 United States Census, there were 40,685 people, 16,389 households, and 10,635 families residing in the county.

2010 census
As of the 2010 census, there were 46,480 people living in the county. The racial makeup of the county was 60.5% White, 33.9% Black, 0.3% Native American, 0.5% Asian, <0.0% Pacific Islander, 0.1% from some other race and 1.2% from two or more races. 3.6% were Hispanic or Latino of any race.

2000 census
As of the 2000 census, there were 51,979 people, 19,349 households, and 13,911 families living in the county.  The population density was 58 people per square mile (22/km2).  There were 22,310 housing units at an average density of 25 per square mile (10/km2).  The racial makeup of the county was 64.45% White, 32.70% Black or African American, 0.26% Native American, 0.38% Asian, 0.03% Pacific Islander, 1.07% from other races, and 1.12% from two or more races.  2.25% of the population were Hispanic or Latino of any race.

There were 19,349 households, out of which 36.00% had children under the age of 18 living with them, 50.00% were married couples living together, 17.40% had a female householder with no husband present, and 28.10% were non-families. 24.70% of all households were made up of individuals, and 10.70% had someone living alone who was 65 years of age or older.  The average household size was 2.64 and the average family size was 3.15.

In the county, the population was spread out, with 29.60% under the age of 18, 9.90% from 18 to 24, 27.50% from 25 to 44, 20.80% from 45 to 64, and 12.20% who were 65 years of age or older.  The median age was 33 years. For every 100 females there were 91.80 males.  For every 100 females age 18 and over, there were 87.70 males.

The median income for a household in the county was $27,479, and the median income for a family was $32,648. Males had a median income of $29,645 versus $19,782 for females. The per capita income for the county was $13,978.  About 19.00% of families and 23.00% of the population were below the poverty line, including 31.10% of those under age 18 and 19.80% of those age 65 or over.

Government
The Mississippi County Judge is John Alan Nelson.
While a traditionally Democratic area, Mississippi County has voted Republican in the past four presidential elections.

Economy

The economy of Mississippi County transitioned from agriculture (especially cotton) to manufacturing (mostly steel production) beginning in the 1980s. Over $2.1 billion has been invested in plants and supporting infrastructure in the county, with major facilities being operated by Nucor and Big River Steel (a U.S. Steel company). As of 2021 Mississippi County is the second-largest steel producing county in the United States. The county's position near the center of the United States and along the Mississippi River allows the input for steel mills, scrap metal, to be shipped in on barges, often the most inexpensive method of shipping, and by railroad from Memphis. Company executives have also praised the work ethic of the rural farm families of the area as a natural fit for ironworkers.

Education

Public education
Mississippi County is home to the following public school districts, listed in order of student population:

 Blytheville School District 
 Osceola School District
 Gosnell School District
 Southern Mississippi County School District
 Manila School District
 Buffalo Island Central School District 
 Armorel School District

The following school districts are based outside of the county but serve portions:
 East Poinsett County School District
 KIPP: Delta Public Schools
 Nettleton School District

Libraries
Mississippi County is served by the Mississippi–Crittenden Regional Library System, which includes the Mississippi County Library System (central library) and 13 branch libraries in communities throughout the county.

Media

Radio
FM
FM 88.3 KBCM Blytheville
FM 93.9 KAMJ Gosnell
FM 96.3 KHLS Blytheville
FM 103.7 KAIA K279BJ Blytheville
FM 107.3 KQXF Osceola

AM
AM 860 KOSE Wilson

Print
NEA Town Courier, Newspaper, Blytheville, Arkansas
The Osceola Times, Newspaper, Osceola, Arkansas

Television
There are no television stations in Mississippi County, Arkansas. Mississippi County, Arkansas is placed in the Memphis, TN Television Market. Those stations include:
ABC- WATN 24
NBC- WMC 5
CBS- WREG 3
Fox- WHBQ 13
PBS- WKNO 10
CW- WLMT 30
Ion WPXX 50
 
However some residents in county may watch stations from the Jackson, TN, Jonesboro, AR, or Little Rock, AR Television Markets.

Communities

Cities

Blytheville (county seat)
Gosnell
Joiner
Keiser
Leachville
Luxora
Manila
Osceola (county seat)
Wilson

Towns

Bassett
Birdsong
Burdette
Dell
Dyess
Etowah
Marie
Victoria

Census-designated places
Armorel

Townships

 Big Lake (Manila)
 Bowen (Gosnell)
 Burdette (Burdette)
 Canadian (Huffman)
 Carson (Marie)
 Chickasawba (Blytheville)
 Dyess (Dyess)
 Fletcher (Luxora, Victoria)
 Golden Lake (Wilson)
 Half Moon Lake
 Hector (Dell)
 Little River (Etowah)
 McGavock (Joiner)
 Monroe (Keiser, Osceola)
 Neal (Leachville)
 Scott (Bassett)
 Whitton (Birdsong)

See also
 Arkansas Highway 119 (1927–2022), former state highway in Mississippi County
Island 35 Mastodon
 List of lakes in Mississippi County, Arkansas
 National Register of Historic Places listings in Mississippi County, Arkansas

References

External links

 

 
1833 establishments in Arkansas Territory
Populated places established in 1833
Arkansas placenames of Native American origin
Arkansas counties on the Mississippi River